Heinrich Rashid Roelfse (born 25 January 1990) is a professional South African rugby union player for the SWD Eagles in the Currie Cup and the Rugby Challenge. His regular position is tighthead prop.

Career

Youth

Roelfse went to school in George High School and earned a selection to the 2008 South Western Districts Under-18 Craven Week squad. In 2009, he moved to Welkom to join the  rugby team. He played for the  side in the 2009 Under-19 Provincial Championship and then progressed to the  side, making eleven appearances for them in the 2010 and 2011 Under-21 Provincial Championships.

Griffons

Roelfse was included in the ' senior squad for the 2012 Vodacom Cup competition. He made his first class debut playing off the bench in their opening match of the competition against  in Kimberley, with the Griffons suffering a 55–10 loss against their  franchise partners.

Roelfse returned to the side for their 2013 Vodacom Cup campaign, but was limited to just three appearances off the bench during the competition.

Roelfse played in all of the Griffons' matches in 2014, starting all seven of their matches in the 2014 Vodacom Cup competition and all five of their 2014 Currie Cup qualification matches. He played in the final and helped the Griffons win the match 23–21 to win their first trophy for six years.

References

South African rugby union players
Living people
1990 births
People from Mossel Bay
Rugby union props
Griffons (rugby union) players
Falcons (rugby union) players
SWD Eagles players
Rugby union players from the Western Cape